Scott Forrest (born 23 August 1994) is a British amateur boxer who is affiliated with Lochend ABC. He represented Scotland at the Commonwealth Games in 2014 and 2018.

Forrest was selected to compete at the 2019 World Championships in Yekaterinburg, Russia, where he lost by split decision (4:1) to Sanjeet Sanjeet in the second round.

References

1994 births
Living people
British male boxers
Boxers at the 2014 Commonwealth Games
Boxers at the 2018 Commonwealth Games
Commonwealth Games competitors for Scotland
Heavyweight boxers
20th-century British people
21st-century British people